Monroe County is a county  in the U.S. state of Wisconsin. As of the 2020 census, the population was 46,274. Its county seat is Sparta.

Geography

United States Army posts
 Fort McCoy, Wisconsin

Adjacent counties
 Jackson County - north
 Juneau County - east
 Vernon County - south
 La Crosse County - west

Demographics

2020 census
As of the census of 2020, the population was 46,274. The racial makeup of the county was 89.2% White, 1.4% Black or African American, 1.3% Native American, 0.8% Asian, 0.1% Pacific Islander, 2.1% from other races, and 5.0% from two or more races. Ethnically, the population was 5.5% Hispanic or Latino of any race.

2000 census

As of the census of 2000, there were 40,899 people, 15,399 households, and 10,794 families residing in the county. The population density was 45 people per square mile (18/km2). There were 16,672 housing units at an average density of 18 per square mile (7/km2). The racial makeup of the county was 96.52% White, 0.46% Black or African American, 0.92% Native American, 0.48% Asian, 0.04% Pacific Islander, 0.85% from other races, and 0.74% from two or more races. 1.81% of the population were Hispanic or Latino of any race. 45.5% were of German, 13.4% Norwegian, 7.6% Irish, 6.3% American and 5.0% English ancestry. 92.9% spoke English, 3.1% German and 2.2% Spanish as their first language.

There were 15,399 households, out of which 34.50% had children under the age of 18 living with them, 56.70% were married couples living together, 8.80% had a female householder with no husband present, and 29.90% were non-families. 25.00% of all households were made up of individuals, and 10.70% had someone living alone who was 65 years of age or older. The average household size was 2.60 and the average family size was 3.11.

In the county, the population was spread out, with 28.10% under the age of 18, 7.70% from 18 to 24, 27.50% from 25 to 44, 22.80% from 45 to 64, and 13.90% who were 65 years of age or older. The median age was 37 years. For every 100 females there were 101.50 males. For every 100 females age 18 and over, there were 99.60 males.

In 2017, there were 534 births, giving a general fertility rate of 67.9 births per 1000 women aged 15–44, the 21st highest rate out of all 72 Wisconsin counties. Of these, 43 of the births occurred at home. Additionally, there were 21 reported induced abortions performed on women of Monroe County residence in 2017.

In 2010, the reported adherence figures for the largest religious groups in Monroe County were Catholic at 9,250 adherents, Wisconsin Synod Lutheran at 3,102 adherents, ELCA Lutheran at 2,297 adherents, Amish at 1,627 adherents, LCMC Lutheran at 1,270 adherents, and United Methodist at 1,155 adherents.

Transportation

Major highways

  Interstate 90
  Interstate 94
  U.S. Highway 12
  Highway 16 (Wisconsin)
  Highway 21 (Wisconsin)
  Highway 27 (Wisconsin)
  Highway 33 (Wisconsin)
  Highway 71 (Wisconsin)
  Highway 131 (Wisconsin)
  Highway 162 (Wisconsin)
  Highway 173 (Wisconsin)

Railroads
Canadian Pacific
Union Pacific
Amtrak
Tomah station

Buses
Scenic Mississippi Regional Transit
List of intercity bus stops in Wisconsin

Airports
 Sparta/Fort McCoy Airport
 Bloyer Field Airport (Y72)

Communities

Cities
 Sparta (county seat)
 Tomah

Villages

 Cashton
 Kendall
 Melvina
 Norwalk
 Oakdale
 Warrens
 Wilton
 Wyeville

Towns

 Adrian
 Angelo
 Byron
 Clifton
 Glendale
 Grant
 Greenfield
 Jefferson
 La Grange
 Lafayette
 Leon
 Lincoln
 Little Falls
 New Lyme
 Oakdale
 Portland
 Ridgeville
 Scott
 Sheldon
 Sparta
 Tomah
 Wellington
 Wells
 Wilton

Census-designated places
 Cataract
 Tunnel City

Unincorporated communities

 Angelo
 Clifton
 Farmers Valley
 Four Corners
 Glendale
 Jacksonville
 Kirby
 Leon
 Norway Ridge
 Oil City
 Portland
 Raymore
 Ridgeville
 St. Mary's
 Scotts Junction
 Shennington
 Spring Bank Park
 Valley Junction

Politics

See also
 National Register of Historic Places listings in Monroe County, Wisconsin

References

Further reading
 Biographical History of La Crosse, Monroe and Juneau Counties, Wisconsin. Chicago: Lewis Publishing Company, 1892.
 Richards, Randolph A. (ed.) History of Monroe County Wisconsin Past and Present Including an account of the Cities, Towns, and Villages of the County. Chicago: C. F. Cooper, 1912.

External links

 Monroe County government website
 Monroe County map from the Wisconsin Department of Transportation

 
1854 establishments in Wisconsin